G.S. Phoebus Kremasti Football Club is a Greek football club, based in Kremasti, Rhodes, Greece.

Honours

Domestic Titles and honours

 Gamma Ethniki champion: 1
 1971-72
 Greek Football Amateur Cup Winners: 2
 1971-72, 2012-13
 Dodecanese FCA champion: 10
 1963-64, 1966-67, 1970-71, 1971-72, 1975-76, 1978-79, 1986-87, 1995-96, 2012-13, 2017-18
 Dodecanese FCA Cup Winners: 9
 1970-71, 1971-72, 1978-79, 1983-84, 1986-87, 1987-88, 1993-94, 2012-13, 2013-14

References

Football clubs in South Aegean
Rhodes (regional unit)
Association football clubs established in 1927
1927 establishments in Greece
Gamma Ethniki clubs